Gingicithara cylindrica is a species of sea snail, a marine gastropod mollusk in the family Mangeliidae.

Description
The shell of the adult snail varies between 4 mm and 18 mm.

The shell is slightly shouldered, longitudinally finely ribbed, the ribs attaining the suture, transversely elevately striated. It is transparent white, stained with pale brown, spotted on the shoulder with orange-brown.

Australian shells differ from the figure of Reeve by fewer and coarser radials, absence of subsutural colour markings, and a rather broader build.

Distribution
This marine species occurs off the Philippines, Queensland, Australia, and off the Cook Islands

References

 Reeve, L.A. 1846. Monograph of the genus Mangelia. pls 1–8 in Reeve, L.A. (ed). Conchologia Iconica. London : L. Reeve & Co. Vol. 3.
 Springsteen, F.J. & Leobrera, F.M. 1986. Shells of the Philippines. Manila : Carfel Seashell Museum 377 pp., 100 pls.

External links
 
  Tucker, J.K. 2004 Catalog of recent and fossil turrids (Mollusca: Gastropoda). Zootaxa 682:1-1295.
 Kilburn R.N. 1992. Turridae (Mollusca: Gastropoda) of southern Africa and Mozambique. Part 6. Subfamily Mangeliinae, section 1. Annals of the Natal Museum, 33: 461–575

cylindrica